Elections to the Wigan Council were held on Thursday, 5 May 1983, with one third of the council up for election. The election seen only the main three parties contesting for the first time and one gain in Tyldesley East with Alliance winning their seventh seat from Labour. The Conservatives, contesting a low of seventeen wards, managed their lowest voter share since the council's creation. Overall turnout rose to a relative high of 39.1%.

Election result

This result had the following consequences for the total number of seats on the council after the elections:

Ward results

References

1983 English local elections
1983
1980s in Greater Manchester